Taylor Fritz was the defending champion but chose not to defend his title.

Santiago Giraldo won the title after defeating Quentin Halys 4–6, 6–4, 6–2 in the final.

Seeds

Draw

Finals

Top half

Bottom half

References
Main Draw
Qualifying Draw

Fairfield Challenger - Singles
Fairfield Challenger